Kevin Robert Morby (born April 2, 1988) is an American musician, singer, and songwriter. A former member of Woods and The Babies, Morby has released seven solo studio albums: Harlem River (2013), Still Life (2014), Singing Saw (2016), City Music (2017), Oh My God (2019), Sundowner (2020), and This Is a Photograph (2022).

Biography

Early life, Woods, and The Babies
Kevin Morby was born in Lubbock, Texas on April 2, 1988; his family relocated around the U.S. due to his father's employment with General Motors before settling in Kansas City, Missouri. Morby learned to play guitar when he was 10. In his teens he formed the band Creepy Aliens.

17-year-old Morby dropped out of Blue Valley Northwest High School, got his GED, and moved from his native Kansas City to Brooklyn in the mid-2000s, supporting himself by working bike delivery and café jobs. Morby has stated he had "loved New York from the movies" he'd seen, "I just wanted to experience it". He later joined the noise-folk group Woods on bass. While living in Brooklyn, he became close friends and roommates with Cassie Ramone of the punk trio Vivian Girls, and the two formed a side project together called The Babies, who released albums in 2011 and 2012.

Harlem River, Still Life, and Singing Saw (2013–2016)
Following his move to Los Angeles, Morby recorded a collection of songs with Babies producer Rob Barbato that were intended to be an homage to New York City. Released in 2013 by Woodsist Records, the eight-song collection was called Harlem River and became Morby's debut as a solo artist. The album also features drummer Justin Sullivan (The Babies) as well as contributions from Will Canzoneri, Tim Presley (White Fence), Dan Iead, and Cate Le Bon.

While on tour, Morby wrote songs that were later featured on his second album, Still Life. The album was once again produced by Barbato and released on October 14, 2014.

Morby worked with Sam Cohen (Apollo Sunshine, Yellowbirds) on his third album, titled Singing Saw, which was released on April 15, 2016.

In 2016, Morby wrote Beautiful Strangers, a protest song in remembrance of Paris 2015 attacks, Orlando 2016 shooting, and death of Freddie Gray. After various live performance that year, it was released as a single in October 2016, with the proceeds benefitting Everytown for Gun Safety.

City Music (2017–2018)
Morby's fourth studio album was recorded with his live band, with guitarist Meg Duffy noting: "We all worked on the next record together, pretty collaboratively in terms of arranging and playing. We spent a week in a beautiful studio, up near Stinson Beach." The album, City Music, was released in June 2017.

Apart from City Music he also released in 2017 a cover version of “After Hours,” from the Velvet Underground’s 1969 self-titled album, in duo with Waxahatchee. As a tribute to Jason Molina, the duo covered in January 2018 two Jason Molina tracks for MusiCares, an American charity supporting musicians’ health. The digital single, also available as 7” vinyl through Dead Oceans, contained the two songs, “Farewell Transmission” and “The Dark Don’t Hide It”. The longtime private and musical relationship later led to touring and shows together, among others SXSW shows and a successful Australia tour (Sydney, Melbourne) in November 2018.

Oh My God (2019)
Morby's fifth studio album, Oh My God,  was announced on February 27, 2019. The first single off the album, "No Halo" was released on the same day. The album was released April 26, 2019 via Dead Oceans and was met with wide critical acclaim (19 of 20 published reviews aggregated on Metacritic were scored positive). It was featured in the April 24, 2019 The Wall Street Journal print edition headlined “Devine Intervention” and called Morby’s best.  The album reached number 2 on Billboard charts Heatseekers albums. In September 2019, Morby reunited with Woods for a special performance at their Woodsist festival.

Sundowner and This Is a Photograph (2020-present)
Morby's sixth studio album, Sundowner, was announced on September 1, 2020. The first single off the album, "Campfire", was released on the same day. The album was released on October 16, 2020 via Dead Oceans.

On May 1, 2020, Morby released a live version of Beautiful Strangers & Harlem River on an album titled On Mon Dieu: Live à Paris. The recording came from Morby's sold-out performance at the Cabaret Sauvage in 2019. The album was released on Morby's Bandcamp through Dead Oceans. In October 2020, Morby released a standalone single, "US Mail", with an accompanying music video as well as sharing his own P.O. box number as a way to promote the USPS.

In February 2021, Marc Maron mentioned several times on Instagram Live that he doesn't know who Morby is, which Morby responded to on his own Instagram page, eventually leading to Maron posting an interview with Morby on Instagram Live.

On October 12, 2021, Morby and Hamilton Leithauser, who toured together in the fall of 2021, released the single "Virginia Beach". On October 8, 2021, Morby released A Night at the Little Los Angeles, an album of 4-track demo versions of songs that were originally on his 2020 album Sundowner. On December 13, 2021, Morby released "I Hear You Calling", a cover of the Bill Fay song, as a part of Dead Oceans' Bill Fay tribute 7" series.

On March 3, 2022, Morby announced that his seventh studio album, This Is a Photograph, will be released on Dead Oceans on May 13, 2022. The lead single of the same name was released on March 3, 2022.

On January 25, 2023, Morby released Music from Montana Story, the official soundtrack to the 2021 drama film Montana Story, through Dead Oceans.

Mare Records
In June 2017, Morby officially launched his new label imprint, Mare Records, with the signing of Shannon Lay and announcement of her new LP, Living Water. Mare will operate as an imprint of the Woodsist label, which also released Morby's first two solo albums.
Anna St Louis' debut album, If Only There Was a River, was scheduled to be released in December 2018 on Woodsist / Mare.

Influences
Morby cites Lou Reed, Bob Dylan, Nina Simone, and Simon Joyner among his favorite artists.

Backing band
Morby's live backing band consists of the following:
Cyrus Gengras – guitar (2020–present), bass guitar (2016–2020)

Former
Justin Sullivan – drums (2013–2016; 2020)
Meg Duffy – guitar, keyboards, backing vocals (2015–2018)
Nick Kinsey – drums (2016–2020)

Discography

Solo
Studio albums
Harlem River (2013)
Still Life (2014)
Singing Saw (2016)
City Music (2017)
Oh My God (2019)
Sundowner (2020)
This Is a Photograph (2022)

Soundtrack albums
Music from Montana Story (2023)

Demo albums
A Night at the Little Los Angeles (2021)

Live albums
 Oh Mon Dieu: Live a Paris (2020)

with Woods
At Echo Lake (2010)
Sun and Shade (2011)
Bend Beyond (2012)

with The Babies
 The Babies (2011)
 Our House on the Hill (2012)

Personal life
In 2017, Morby moved from Los Angeles to Overland Park, Kansas, near where he grew up. He is in a relationship with Katie Crutchfield (of the band Waxahatchee). Together they have covered songs by Jason Molina, Bob Dylan, The Velvet Underground and Everclear.

References

1988 births
Living people
Musicians from Kansas City, Missouri
21st-century American singers
American rock guitarists
American male guitarists
American male singer-songwriters
American indie rock musicians
American rock singers
American rock songwriters
Singer-songwriters from California
21st-century American guitarists
Singer-songwriters from Missouri
Guitarists from Los Angeles
Guitarists from Missouri
21st-century American male singers
People from Lubbock, Texas
Dead Oceans artists
Singer-songwriters from Texas